Michael Joseph Ready (April 9, 1893 – May 2, 1957) was an American prelate of the Catholic Church. He served as bishop of the Diocese of Columbus in Ohio from 1944 until his death.

Biography

Early life 
The second youngest of 14 children, Michael Ready was born on April 9, 1893, in New Haven, Connecticut, to Michael T. and Mary A. (née Ellis) Ready. His parents were Irish immigrants who moved to the United States in the 1880s. In 1900, he and his family moved to Mansfield, Ohio, and later to Barberton, Ohio.

Ready studied at St. Vincent Seminary in Latrobe, Pennsylvania, at St. Bernard Seminary in Rochester, New York, and at St. Mary Seminary in Cleveland, Ohio.

Priesthood 
Ready was ordained to the priesthood for the Diocese of Cleveland by Bishop John Farrelly on September 14, 1918. He then served as an assistant pastor, teacher, and director of the Society for the Propagation of the Faith in the diocese. In 1931, he was named Assistant general secretary of the National Catholic Welfare Conference, becoming its general secretary in 1936. He was raised to the rank of monsignor in 1934.

In 1939, Ready joined Bishops John Gannon and James Griffin in a visit to Mexico to confer with Archbishop Luis Martínez.  They were discussing the founding of a seminary in Las Vegas, New Mexico, to supply priests for the Mexican Church, since seminaries were at that time illegal in that country. During the Spanish Civil War in the late 1930s, Ready denounced the Spanish government for its anti-clerical polices.

Ready gave the benediction at the 1941 inauguration of President Franklin D. Roosevelt. Later that year, he met with Roosevelt after the latter made controversial remarks regarding the status of religious freedom in the Soviet Union.

In 1942, Ready declared that "the liberty and institutions" of the United States were threatened by the same "rampant totalitarian military forces which harass the Church and all that the Church has built," in an implicit reference to Japan. In 1944, Reverend Stanislaus Orlemanski returned to the United States from a visit to the Soviet Uniton to meet Premier Joseph Stalin, who signed his written support for religious freedom.  Ready described the priest's trip as "a political burlesque...staged and directed by capable Soviet agents," saying, "What we need from Stalin is his declaration of full religious freedom in Russia, not his signature." Ready also opposed military conscription in the United States, favoring volunteer recruiting

Bishop of Columbus

On November 11, 1944, Ready was appointed the fifth bishop of the Diocese of Columbus by Pope Pius XII. He received his episcopal consecration on December 14, 1944, from Archbishop Amleto Cicognani, with Archbishop John McNicholas and Bishop Edward Hoban serving as co-consecrators, at St. Matthew Cathedral in Washington, D.C. He was formally installed at St. Joseph's Cathedral on January 4, 1945.

One of Ready's first tasks was overseeing the erection of the Diocese of Steubenville from the eastern and southeastern portions of the Diocese of Columbus, as well as the consolidation of portions of the Archdiocese of Cincinnati into Columbus. He established the Catholic Welfare Bureau and appointed a director of charities for the diocese. Ready was a critic of the Ohio State University Board of Trustees decision in 1951 that all campus speakers had to be cleared by University President Howard L. Bevis in advance. During his tenure, Ready also served as chair of the Bishops' Committee on Motion Pictures; he reported that Hollywood produced more films with "wholesome and moral qualities" in 1952.

Ready also organized the Holy Name Society, a Parent-Teacher Organization, the Council of Catholic Women, the Catholic Youth Council, and the St. Vincent de Paul Society in the diocese. He created 18 new parishes and oversaw the construction of nine elementary and five high schools. Ready founded two nursing homes, the diocesan Child Guidance Center, and the Catholic Student Center at Ohio State University. He worked with his fellow Ohio bishops to start the Ohio Catholic Welfare Conference.

Ready died in Columbus from a cerebral hemorrhage on May 2, 1957, at age 64.  He was buried at St. Joseph Cemetery in Lockbourne, Ohio. Bishop Ready High School in Columbus is named in his honor.

References

1893 births
1957 deaths
Saint Vincent College alumni
St. Bernard's School of Theology and Ministry alumni
Saint Mary Seminary and Graduate School of Theology alumni
Roman Catholic Diocese of Cleveland
Religious leaders from New Haven, Connecticut
Roman Catholic bishops of Columbus
20th-century Roman Catholic bishops in the United States
American people of Irish descent
People from Mansfield, Ohio
People from Barberton, Ohio
Catholics from Connecticut